Manitou Passage is a navigable Lake Michigan waterway separating North and South Manitou Island from mainland Michigan. The passage—used by deep-draft lake freighters—is located in Leelanau County and is within the Manitou Passage Underwater Preserve.

John F. Kennedy's president yacht S/Y Manitou was named after Manitou Passage.

References

External links
NOAA Nautical Chart 14912

Bodies of water of Leelanau County, Michigan
Lake Michigan
Sleeping Bear Dunes National Lakeshore
Straits of Michigan